Farmers State Bank is an historic limestone building located at 716 South Austin Avenue in Georgetown, Texas, United States. Once housing a Farmers State Bank, the building received Texas Historical Marker status in 2006, and currently houses the Williamson Museum. It is part of the Williamson County Courthouse Historic District.

See also

 List of Recorded Texas Historic Landmarks (Trinity-Zavala)
 Williamson County Courthouse Historic District

References

External links
 

Buildings and structures in Georgetown, Texas